

The Helpmann Award for Best New Australian Work is an award presented by Live Performance Australia (LPA), an employers' organisation which serves as the peak body in the live entertainment and performing arts industries in Australia. The accolade is handed out at the annual Helpmann Awards, which celebrates achievements in musical theatre, contemporary music, comedy, opera, classical music, theatre, dance and physical theatre in Australia.

The award is presented to the author, composer, book writer or lyricist of the production.

, the 2019 event was the last one held, owing to the COVID-19 pandemic in Australia.

Winners and nominees

See also
Helpmann Awards

References

External links
The official Helpmann Awards website

N
Awards established in 2001
2001 establishments in Australia